Kyron Sullivan (born 22 June 1976) is a Welsh professional golfer.

Sullivan attended the University of Wales Institute, Cardiff and briefly worked as an IT analyst before deciding to attempt professional golf in 2002. He spent two years playing on the PGA EuroPro Tour and a further three on the Challenge Tour, where he won for the first time in 2006. This helped him to fifth place in the rankings, earning him a place on the European Tour for 2007. Sullivan ended his debut year 131st in the Order of Merit, just outside the players who automatically retained their cards, but he still gained entry to several events in 2008. Since 2009, he has returned to the Challenge Tour full-time.

In 2008, Sullivan also won the South Wales Open.

Professional wins (3)

Challenge Tour wins (1)

Challenge Tour playoff record (1–1)

PGA EuroPro Tour wins (1)

Other wins (1)
2008 South Wales Open

Team appearances
Amateur
Palmer Cup (representing Great Britain & Ireland): 1998 (tie), 1999, 2000 (winners), 2001
European Amateur Team Championship (representing Wales): 2001

See also
2006 Challenge Tour graduates

References

External links

Welsh male golfers
European Tour golfers
Sportspeople from Cardiff
Sportspeople from Barry, Vale of Glamorgan
1976 births
Living people